Olenecamptus adlbaueri is a species of beetle in the family Cerambycidae. It was described by Bjornstad and Minetti.

References

Dorcaschematini